"Love Talks" is a song written by Tom Shapiro, Michael Garvin and Bucky Jones, and recorded by American country music artist Ronnie McDowell.  It was released in July 1985 as the second single from the album In a New York Minute.  The song reached #9 on the Billboard Hot Country Singles & Tracks chart.

Chart performance

References

1985 singles
1985 songs
Ronnie McDowell songs
Songs written by Tom Shapiro
Song recordings produced by Buddy Killen
Epic Records singles
Songs written by Michael Garvin
Songs written by Bucky Jones